Salim Al Mamari (born 4 May 1999) is an Omani professional footballer who plays as a defender.

Career statistics

Club

Notes

References

1999 births
Living people
Omani footballers
Omani expatriate footballers
Association football defenders
UAE Pro League players
Al Jazira Club players
Baniyas Club players
Omani expatriate sportspeople in the United Arab Emirates
Expatriate footballers in the United Arab Emirates